The 2013 DBL Playoffs were the final phase of the 2012–13 Dutch Basketball League. It started on 17 April and ended on 23 May 2013. EiffelTowers Den Bosch were the defending champions. ZZ Leiden won the playoffs and its third championship. Aris Leeuwarden, who featured in their first finals ever, finished as runners-up.

Quarterfinals

(1) EiffelTowers Den Bosch – (8) Stepco BSW

(2) Zorg en Zekerheid Leiden – (7) Matrixx Magixx

(3) GasTerra Flames – (6) Den Helder Kings

Aris Leeuwarden vs Landstede Basketbal

Semifinals

(1) EiffelTowers Den Bosch – (4) Aris Leeuwarden

(2) Zorg en Zekerheid Leiden – (3) GasTerra Flames

Finals: (2) Zorg en Zekerheid Leiden – (4) Aris Leeuwarden

Dutch Basketball League playoffs
Playoffs